The trickster is a common stock character in folklore and popular culture. A clever, mischievous person or creature, the trickster achieves goals through the use of trickery. A trickster may trick others simply for amusement or for survival in a dangerous world. The trickster could  be a personification of the chaos that the world needs to function.

An archetypical example is the simple peasant successfully put to the test by a King who wishes a suitable suitor for his daughter. In this fairy tale, no brave and valiant prince or knight succeeds. Aided only by his natural wit, the peasant evades danger and triumphs over monsters and villains without fighting. Thus the most unlikely candidate passes the trials and receives the prize. Such characters are a staple of animated cartoons, in particular those used and developed by Tex Avery et al. during the Golden Age of American animation.

Characteristics 
Hynes and Doty, in Mythical Trickster Figures (1997) state that every trickster has several of the following six traits:

 fundamentally ambiguous and anomalous
 deceiver and trick-player
 shape-shifter or master of disguise
 situation-inverter
 messenger and imitator of the gods
 sacred and lewd bricoleur

Tricksters in Indian Mythology 

 Ahswhrat - Minor god of trickery and mischief
 Indra - In Indian and Hindu mythology, Indra is King of Gods who always use tricks and supernatural powers to save his position as King.   His biggest weapon is Vajrayudha, a weapon made from the spine bone of Dadichi. It brings ultimate destruction with lights and thunders. 
 Narada - In Indian and Hindu Mythology, Narada is a character who travels into any dimension or planet without any permission from any god.   He is an interplanetary messenger who always take control over the situation by taking advantage of weaknesses.  His ultimate intentions are towards betterment of mankind [Compare with Hermes in Greek mythology.
 Shakuni - According to Mahabharata, Shakuni is a real trickster who devoted his whole life in taking  revenge on the Great Ancient Kuru Dynasty by his tricks. He was born in Gandhar Province (Presently Afghanistan). He has a sister, Gandhari, who was married to Dhritrashtra, blind prince of Hastinapur, who later became King of Hastinapur. Shakuni was not told about the blindness of the upcoming king before the  marriage to his sister.   But after the marriage, Shakuni's father can't protest because of fear.  Shakuni wasn't afraid and lived in Hastinapur as brother to the queen so he could take revenge. He trained his nephews and instilled poison and hatred in their minds towards their cousins. Later, a large battle, Mahabharata, lasting 18 days, was fought between the cousins ending in the destruction to the whole Kuru dynasty. Shakuni died on the 18th day of battle after succeeding in his revenge .
[There is another mythology that says: Gandhari was Manglik that means  her first husband will die, making her widow. So, his father married her to a goat in her childhood and sacrifice that goat. When, King Dhritrashtra knew this, he was very angry because he was married to a widow. So, He prisoned the whole family of Shakuni and gave them a fist of rice only for meal, daily. Shakuni's father understood that they are meant to be killed in prison. So,  he chose the one member of his family who can take revenge and that was Shakuni and he broke one of Shakuni's leg, so that, he remember his purpose each and every time he walks.]

Tricksters in folktale and fiction 

 Anansi - The spider trickster of African origin. He considers himself cunning enough to trick and outwit anyone, but is also proud, lazy and impulsive, which often proves his undoing.
  Br'er Rabbit - A slave trickster of African American origin.
 Coyotes in various Native American mythologies.
 Curupira - A Brazilian folklore (male) jungle genie that protects the animals and the trees of the forests. It has red hair and backwards feet to confuse hunters and lumberjacks.
 Dionysus - Greek God of wine, madness, and ecstasy. More than any other Greek God, he is associated with shape-shifting and taking on other identities (which is part of why he is also associated with actors). A thoroughly ambiguous person, in personality, but also in his androgynous figure, one can never know exactly what he will do next.
 Eris - Greek Goddess of discord in Greek mythology. Infamous for starting a fight between other goddesses over the Apple of Discord, leading to the Judgement of Paris and, ultimately, the Trojan War.
 Eshu/Eleggua/Legba - One of the primary orishas in Yorùbá religion, patron of roads (especially crossroads), doors, and travelers, as well as a spirit of chaos and trickery.
 The Fair Folk in many European cultures.
 Hermes - Messenger of the gods in Greek mythology (or Mercury in Roman mythology), patron of travelers, boundaries and thieves. Notably stole a herd of cattle from Apollo in his youth, but then invented the lyre and gave it to Apollo as payment.
 Hershele Ostropoler - In Ashkenazic Jewish folklore, based on a real person who lived during the 18th century.
 Huehuecoyotl - the gender-changing coyote god of music, dance, mischief and song of Pre-Columbian Mexico and Aztec Mythology. Befitting a trickster, he is the patron of uninhibited sexuality and often engages in trickery against the gods with camaraderie among mortals. 
 Jack - (best known from the story Jack and the Beanstalk) is a young boy who uses his wit to outsmart characters in many stories.
 Jack Mary Ann - A folk hero from the Wrexham area of north Wales whose fictionalised exploits continue to circulate in local folklore.
 Jacob - Biblical Patriarch and the ancestor of the Israelites.
 John the Conqueror - Character who appears in many stories from the African American tradition. He is a slave that is so much smarter than any slave-master, he simply cannot be controlled.
 Kitsune - In Japanese folklore, they are described as "tricksters" with no care for the concept of right or wrong.
 Kuma Lisa - A fox and trickster figure in Bulgarian folklore.
 Loki - A cunning, shape-shifting god, sometimes benefactor and sometimes foe to the gods of Asgard. Famous as a catalyst for Ragnarök. The precise nature of Loki's being defies clear classification, as there is little detail regarding his mother, but he is at least half-giant on his father's side. 
 Māui - A Polynesian culture hero famous for his exploits and his trickery. 
 Maximón - A cunning deity in modern Mayan tradition. Famous for being a womanizer and using trickery to achieve his goals.
 Max and Moritz - Principal characters of the book of the same name written by Wilhelm Busch in 1865. Famous for their tricks, Max and Moritz quickly became famous characters in Germany.
 Nasreddin - In Turkish folklore, based on a historical 13th Century person.
 Odysseus - Hero and king in Greek mythology. Came up with the idea for the Trojan Horse, and used his wits to escape perilous situations during the Odyssey, e.g. outwitting Polyphemus the Cyclops.
 Pan - God of shepherds and flocks. He is a satyr: a creature that has the upper body of a man and the legs of a goat. In many stories, they talk of Pan, or just satyrs, in general, are known to play tricks on people, especially children, for their amusement.
 Panurge - Companion of the Giant Pantagruel in the books of Francois Rabelais.
 Pedro Urdemales – a trickster folk hero from Iberian and Latin American folklore
 Prometheus - Tricks Zeus over sacrifices at Mecone, steals fire on behalf of mankind.
 Puck/Robin Goodfellow - From Shakespeare's A Midsummer Night's Dream, plays tricks on a group of humans who stumble into a forest. His final monologue explains the nature of tricksters.
 Puss in Boots - A clever and magical cat who tricks a king into raising a lowborn miller to the station of a great noble, and defeats a shapeshifting ogre by tricking him into becoming a mouse.
 Raven amongst the Indigenous peoples of the Pacific Northwest Coast.
 Reynard - A red fox and trickster figure who plays a central role in the moralistic fables of the Reynard cycle.
 Saci - A Brazilian folklore character, a one-legged black or mulatto youngster with holes in the palms of his hands, who smokes a pipe and wears a magical red cap.
 Sang Kancil, the mouse-deer trickster of Malaysian and Indonesian folklore.
 Sisyphus - Sly and audacious mortal king in Greek mythology who managed to cheat death twice, but angered the gods in the process and was condemned to endlessly push a boulder up a slope in Tartarus.
 Sly Peter - In Bulgarian and Macedonian folklore.
 Sun Wukong - Irrepressible Monkey King of Chinese mythology, whose exploits are described in Journey to the West.
 Sri Thanonchai - In Thai and other Southeast Asian folklore. He is known as Xieng Mieng or Sieng Mieng in Laos, Saga Duasa in Myanmar, and Ah Thonchuy Prach in Cambodia.
 Susanoo - Amaterasu's brother, god of storms and trickster of Japanese mythology. His destructive behaviour gets him banished from Heaven, though he later redeems himself through deeds of heroism.
 Trạng Quỳnh – A trickster in Vietnamese folklore is based on a historical figure of the 17th and 18th centuries, his deceitful targets are often high-class figures in society.
 Till Eulenspiegel – Trickster of German folklore.
 Tokoloshe – Trickster of Zulu mythology.
 Twm Siôn Cati - A Welsh trickster who was reputed to have lived in the 16th century: according to legend, he was a gentleman farmer by day, but a highwayman at night.
 Zomo, a rabbit from Nigerian folklore.

In movies, television, animation, novels, short stories, comics, and video games 

The Trickster - an immortal extra-dimensional alien from the show Doctor Who.
 Bart Simpson - From the animated TV series The Simpsons.
 Bill Cipher - A demon resembling a one-eyed triangle, and the main antagonist of the animated series Gravity Falls. He has many supernatural abilities and loves to use them to cause trouble for humans, including offering deals that invariably turn out badly for those who take them.
 Bugs Bunny - A rabbit trickster, in some respects similar to Brer Rabbit.
 Cegorach - the trickster god (and one of the few survivors from their pantheon) of the Eldar in the Warhammer 40,000 setting.
 Clopin - King of the Gypsies and Master of Ceremonies at the Festival of Fools, from the Disney film The Hunchback of Notre Dame. He is a brightly-clothed jester who can be devious and unpredictable.
 Discord - a former antagonist from My Little Pony: Friendship is Magic. He is the powerful Spirit of Chaos and Disharmony, and has become reformed, though he still sometimes play tricks on others.
 The Doctor - The title character of Doctor Who: Always a situation-inverter, deceiver and bricoleur, and sometimes ambiguous or trick-player, depending on the incarnations.
 El-ahrairah - The Prince of Rabbits, or the "Prince with the Thousand Enemies"; the trickster folk hero of the rabbits in Watership Down.
 Felix the Cat - A "transgressor of boundaries" (in the most literal sense).
 Fen'Harel - An enigmatic member of the elven pantheon and a recurring mythological figure in the Dragon Age series.
 Fred and George Weasley from the Harry Potter series.
 Gaunter O'Dimm - A powerful creature from higher dimensions in video games based on the novels written by Andrzej Sapkowski as one of the many sentient obstacles to the famed monster hunter Geralt of Rivia.
 Jack Sparrow - A notorious pirate captain from Walt Disney's Pirates of the Caribbean film series. Sparrow uses wit and deceit to attain his goals, preferring to end disputes verbally instead of by force.
 James Jesse/The Trickster - A supervillain from DC Comics and a foe of the Flash.
 Jareth - King of the Goblins from Jim Henson's Labyrinth, who changes forms and uses magic to cajole the story's heroine through a series of puzzles.
 Jerry - The mischievous mouse who constantly played tricks on the tomcat from the show Tom and Jerry.
 The Joker - The chaotic counterpart to Batman's strive for order displays several characteristics of the trickster. Inscrutable, unpredictable and a defining obsession with gags and pranks that are sometimes harmless, sometimes deadly.
Joker - The main protagonist of Persona 5 and leader of The Phantom Thieves of Hearts.
 Kickaha - The Trickster from Phillip Jose Farmer’s World of Tiers novel series.  Also known by his true name, Paul Janus Finnegan.
 Loki (Marvel Comics) - From the Marvel Comics series, and from the Marvel movies Thor, The Avengers, Thor: The Dark World, Thor: Ragnarok, and Avengers: Infinity War. He is based directly on the trickster god Loki from Norse mythology.
 The Mask - Wears a mask imbued with Loki's powers and lack of inhibition.
 Mister Mxyzptlk - An imp from the fifth dimension featured in the Superman comics.
 Ms. Gsptlsnz - The girlfriend of Mister Mxyzptlk from the fifth dimension.
 The Pink Panther - A character featured at the start of the film and the animated series of the same name.
 Puck from Gargoyles - Based on the faerie trickster from A Midsummer Night's Dream, he plays a major role in the Disney animated television show "Gargoyles".
 Q - An omnipotent being in Star Trek: The Next Generation, Deep Space Nine, and Voyager, who puts the characters of these shows through various and trials and tricks, seemingly for his own amusement. At times, he seems to be working toward becoming a better, more moral being, or possibly trying to grow the characters and humanity in general in positive ways. But his ultimate goal seems to consistently remain his own entertainment, as being omnipotent has become somewhat boring after so long.
 River Song - Character from Doctor Who who acts as the trickster to the show's titular trickster. She shows up in an episode, causes trouble, drags everyone into insane situations before solving the crisis, often with a kiss.
 Rumplestiltskin - A character from the Mother Goose Grimm fairy tales, in which he fits many of the attributes of the trickster and often tricks other characters for his own nefarious purposes.
 Sera - A brash and capricious Robin Hood-like rogue who is a party member in Dragon Age: Inquisition.
 Silk - or Prince Kheldar of Drasnia, a character in The Belgariad and The Malloreon
 Trickster - From the 1994 horror film Brainscan, starring T. Ryder Smith as the Trickster.
 The Trickster (Supernatural) - An antagonist of Seasons Two and Three of Supernatural, who often plays tricks on Sam and Dean. In Season Five, it is revealed that he is the archangel Gabriel who came to Earth to get away from the fighting between his angelic brothers in Heaven, and that he took on the name of Loki and masqueraded as a pagan god once on earth.
 Tom Cat - From Tom & Jerry
 Tyrion Lannister - Astute observer/manipulator of phenomenon and sexually prodigious, both quintessential traits of the trickster archetype.
 Woody Woodpecker - "A less complex version of the Trickster."
 Yun-Harla - The trickster goddess of the Yuuzhan Vong religion in the New Jedi Order series, who protagonist Jaina Solo impersonates in several novels.
 Zoe - A Targonian kid turned an "Aspect of Twilight", as the embodiment of mischief, imagination, and change in the video game League of Legends.

Notes 

 
Legendary creatures in popular culture
Lists of fictional characters by occupation
Lists of stock characters
Mythological archetypes